Želimir "Željko" Bebek (born 16 December 1945) is a Bosnian and Croatian vocalist and musician most notable for being the lead singer of former Yugoslav rock band Bijelo Dugme from 1974 to 1984. He also has a successful career as a solo artist.

Early years
Bebek was born in Sarajevo, PR Bosnia and Herzegovina, FPR Yugoslavia to Bosnian Croat parents Zvonimir and Katarina. He showed an early interest in music, entertaining his mother's house guests by singing songs he heard on the radio. He also experimented with harmonica, but abandoned it in third grade of primary school as he wanted to play guitar and sing along. His teacher, however, discouraged such intentions so Željko ended up playing mandolin instead. He soon became the school's best mandolin player and was allowed to play guitar as a reward.

At age sixteen, Bebek began taking the stage at Eho 61, an open mic club-like school activity for the musically inclined students of Sarajevo's Second Gymnasium. A couple of years earlier, the same stage saw a performance by teenage Kornelije Kovač who would later also go on to become a famous musician and composer.

Bebek's next musical activity came in a nameless band with Šento Borovčanin and the Redžić brothers – Fadil and Zoran. Bebek carried on playing with the band until Fadil Redžić left to join Indexi.

Career

Kodeksi

In 1965, Eduard "Edo" Bogeljić invited twenty-year-old Bebek to join a cover band he founded called Kodeksi that also featured Ismeta Dervoz on backing vocals and Luciano Paganotto on drums.

Bebek spent several years singing and playing rhythm guitar with the band, helping them become quite prominent locally in the city of Sarajevo. As Kodeksi experienced persistent problems filling the bass guitar spot, Bebek recommended eighteen-year-old Goran Bregović after seeing the teenager play with Beštije in 1969. It would be the beginning of Bebek's long professional association with Bregović that would frequently turn tumultuous.

In fall 1970, after falling out with band mates during the group's stay in Italy, Bebek left Kodeksi and returned home to Sarajevo.

Novi Kodeksi
Shortly after getting back to Sarajevo, Bebek established Novi Kodeksi with another former Kodeksi member Edo Bogeljić. Conceptualized as a return to the original Kodeksi cover repertoire, Bogeljić's and Bebek's band gigged around Sarajevo with diminishing success as the audiences' general taste seemingly moved away from cover music; although at one point they did break a record for the length of performance, spending 32 straight hours playing on stage with break.

The new year 1971 brought more creative stagnation as their repertoire still consisted entirely of foreign covers. In December 1971, Bebek received a notice from the Yugoslav People's Army (JNA) to report for his mandatory military service and Novi Kodeksi played their last gig at Sarajevo's Dom Mladih. Twenty-six years of age at this point, Bebek got married with the intention of settling down and giving up on trying to make a living via playing music altogether.

Jutro

Just as he was about to report for the obligatory army duty in early 1972, twenty-six-year-old Bebek received an invitation from Bregović—whom he hadn't spoken to in a year-and-a-half at that point, ever since their split in Italy—to record "Patim, evo, deset dana" song with Jutro, a new band Bregović formed with Nuno Arnautalić. Bebek accepted, recorded vocals in a studio, and then left for his army stint in Pirot in late February 1972.

Discharged from the army in March 1973 and returning home, Bebek joined Jutro in earnest, but also took a clerk job as a protective measure due to not being certain about the band's creative and commercial potential. Jutro did become successful and he quit the government job to again devote to music full-time. Jutro soon transformed into Bijelo dugme, with Bebek as a founding member.

Bijelo Dugme

Bebek continued as vocalist and occasional bassist in Bijelo dugme from its inception in 1974. Bebek found himself to be a country-wide celebrity. He ended up spending a full decade and recording six studio albums with the band before eventually leaving in April 1984 to fully pursue a solo career.

Solo career
Bebek maintains a solo career, which began during the late 1970s in parallel with his work in Bijelo Dugme.

In 1978, while Bregović was away serving the army stint and Dugme was on hiatus, Bebek recorded a solo album, Skoro da smo isti, with drummer Điđi Jankelić and old friend Edo Bogeljić on guitar and keyboards. The album was released on 28 July 1978, but failed both critically and commercially, selling only 6,000 copies and quickly falling into oblivion. Though Bebek and his collaborators had planned a tour in support of the album, their plans got scrapped following the poor reception.

In late 1983, shortly before officially leaving Bijelo Dugme, Bebek returned to his solo career by recording his second solo album Mene tjera neki vrag. The album was released in 1984, with the title track becoming a moderate radio hit in Yugoslavia.

Throughout his 11-album solo run, Bebek had several major hits, most of them occurring in the 1984–1989 period. Most of his hits had a strong commercial folk influence, including "Oprosti mi što te volim", "Da je sreće bilo", "Laku noć svirači", "Jabuke i vino" (duet with Zana Nimani), "Sinoć sam pola kafane popio" (with lyrics by Bora Đorđević), "Da zna zora" (duet with Halid Bešlić)", "Čaša otrova", "Gdje će ti duša", and others. Also he had several hit ballads like "Žuta Ruža", "I Bog je od nas digao ruke", "Šta je meni ovo trebalo", "Lagano umirem", "Tko je mene prokleo", and "Ne idi sad".

When the Yugoslav wars started, he moved to Zagreb where he continues to live and work. His record labels included Taped Pictures and Croatia Records.

In 2005 he took part in three large reunion concerts of Bijelo dugme, in Zagreb, Sarajevo and Belgrade, performing alongside most of the musicians that passed through the band, including the other two vocalists (Alen Islamović and Tifa).

During 2006, Bebek (in collaboration with Alen Islamović and Tifa) formed a Bijelo dugme tribute band called "B.A.T." (stands for Bebek, Alen, Tifa), which performed on numerous stages around the world between 2006 and 2010. Their 2006 "Kad Bi' Bio Bijelo Dugme" North American tour (together with Okus Meda and Tifa Band), was featured in a documentary titled "B.A.T.: Balkan Rock Nostalgia", (directed by Serb-American filmmaker Branislav R. Tatalović). Bebek was one of the three featured performers alongside Alen Islamovic, and Tifa, in a documentary that followed the musicians while they were on tour.

During 2012, after recording a duet with Crvena Jabuka, Bebek met their producer, Branimir Mihaljević, and together they started working on what will become Bebek's new studio album, first after twelve years. Album entitled Kad poljubac pomiješaš sa vinom was released in late 2012. Some of the songs on the album include "Gdje sam bio", "Kaldrma", "Tango" (duet with Severina Vučković), "Začarani krug" and others.

Personal life

Bebek was born in Sarajevo, Bosnia and Herzegovina in the former SFR Yugoslavia to parents Zvonimir and Katarina. He has been married three times. He has a daughter Silvija from his first marriage, and another daughter Bianca from his second marriage.

From his current, third, marriage with Ružica from Tomislavgrad whom he met in 1997 and soon married, Bebek has a son Zvonimir and daughter Katarina, named after his father and mother.

Discography

With Bijelo Dugme

Studio albums
Kad bi bio bijelo dugme (1974)
Šta bi dao da si na mom mjestu (1975)
Eto! Baš hoću! (1976)
Bitanga i princeza (1979)
Doživjeti stotu (1980)
Uspavanka za Radmilu M. (1983)

Solo

Studio albums
Skoro da smo isti (1978)
Mene tjera neki vrag (1984)
Armija B (1985)
Niko više ne sanja (1989)
Pjevaj moj narode  (1989)
Karmin pjesma i rakija  (1990)
A svemir miruje (1992)
Gori svijet ti ćeš ga ugasiti  (1993)
Puca mi u glavi  (1995)
S tobom i bez tebe  (1999)
Ošini po prašini (2000)
Kad poljubac pomiješaš sa vinom (2012)
Ono nešto naše (2017)
Mali oblak ljubavi (2021)

Singles

References

External links

1945 births
Living people
Musicians from Sarajevo
Yugoslav male singers
Yugoslav rock singers
Bosnia and Herzegovina pop singers
20th-century Bosnia and Herzegovina male singers
Bosnia and Herzegovina folk-pop singers
Bosnia and Herzegovina rock singers
20th-century Croatian male singers
Croatian pop singers
Croatian folk-pop singers
Croatian rock singers
Croats of Bosnia and Herzegovina
Indexi Award winners
Mandolinists
21st-century Croatian male singers
21st-century Bosnia and Herzegovina male singers